James Horlick may refer to:

Sir James Horlick, 1st Baronet (1844–1921) of the Horlick Baronets
Sir James Horlick, 4th Baronet (1886–1972), MP for Gloucester
Sir James Cunliffe William Horlick, 6th Baronet (born 1956) of the Horlick baronets